The communauté de communes Aubusson-Felletin was located in the Creuse département of the Limousin region of central France. It was created in January 2001. It was merged into the new Communauté de communes Creuse Grand Sud in January 2014.

It comprised the following 18 communes:

Ars
Aubusson
Alleyrat
Blessac
Néoux
Saint-Alpinien
Saint-Amand
Saint-Avit-de-Tardes
Saint-Maixant
Saint-Marc-à-Frongier
Saint-Pardoux-le-Neuf
Felletin
Moutier-Rozeille
Sainte-Feyre-la-Montagne
Saint-Frion
Saint-Quentin-la-Chabanne
Vallière
La Villetelle

References

Aubusson-Felletin